Regional District of Nanaimo Transit System provides both conventional bus service and special needs paratransit services within the Regional District of Nanaimo in British Columbia, Canada. The system, operated by the Regional Transportation Services Department, is jointly funded by BC Transit, the provincial agency responsible for transit services outside Metro Vancouver.

Services
There are 17 scheduled bus routes in the region. The transit system operates seven days a week, with reduced service on weekends and holidays. All accessible buses are also equipped with bike racks. In rural areas the buses can be flagged down, as there are no designated bus stops. Passengers who are worried about their personal safety at night can ask the driver to drop them off between regular bus stops.

Regular routes
In September 2015, many of the original routes were renumbered so that all the routes between the Prideaux Exchange and Woodgrove Centre would end in a zero. Routes 12 and 93 were discontinued due to low ridership, while Route 40 (formerly Route 4) was extended to Woodgrove Centre and its circulation was increased to every 15-30 minutes during peak hours.

Paratransit
handyDART is a dial-a-ride service for people with a disability that is sufficiently severe that they are unable to use regular transit buses without assistance. Clients must be pre-registered to make use of this service.

References

External links
Regional District of Nanaimo, Transportation Services, Regional Transit
busline.ca site for Nanaimo Regional Transit System

Transit agencies in British Columbia
Transport in Nanaimo
Regional District of Nanaimo